"Look at the world" is a sacred choral composition by John Rutter, a harvest anthem to his own words. He offered versions for children's choir in unison or a four-part choir, with keyboard or orchestra. It was commissioned by the Council for the Protection of Rural England. The work was published by Oxford University Press in 1996.

History 
Rutter set "Look at the world" as a harvest anthem to his own lyrics in 1996. He responded to a commission from the Council for the Protection of Rural England, meant to be "a widely-usable choral song or anthem on the theme of the environment and our responsibility towards it". It was meant to celebrate the organisation's 70th anniversary. He scored it for either a children's choir in unison or a four-part choir, accompanied by a keyboard instrument or orchestra. The anthem was published by Oxford University Press in 1996. In 2021, a version for a small ensemble of flute, oboe, harp and organ appeared.

Music 
The anthem is in set in 2/2, marked "Brightly" It begins in C major, but modulates twice and ends in D major. It begins with eight measures of instrumental introduction, with broken chords in constant flowing eighth-notes. It is in four stanzas and a refrain, beginning "Praise to thee, O Lord of all creation". In the choral version, only the refrain is in harmony for all four voices, while the stanzas are assigned to varying voices. The third stanza is in B major, and the final stanza in D major. The duration is given as 4.5 minutes.

Recordings 
The anthem was recorded for a 2003 collection of Rutter's Mass of the Children and other sacred music, by the Cambridge Singers and the City of London Sinfonia conducted by the composer. It was recorded for a 2010 collection, A Song in Season of works by Rutter composed since 1996 and mostly not previously recorded, with the composer conducting the Cambridge Singers and the Royal Philharmonic Orchestra. A reviewer from Gramophone described it as "overtly innocent".

References

External links 
 Look at the world singers.com
 

Compositions by John Rutter
1996 compositions
Choral compositions